Can Tries  Gornal is a Barcelona Metro station, in the L'Hospitalet de Llobregat municipality of the Barcelona metropolitan area, and named after the nearby Gornal neighbourhood. The station is served by line L9 and line L10.

The station is located underneath the intersection of Carrer Can Tries and the carrer de Narcís de Monturiol. There is one entrance, from Carrer Can Tries, which serves a below ground ticket hall.

The station was opened in 2016, at the time of the extension of line L9 from Zona Universitaria station to Airport T1 station.

Line 10 has served the station since 8 September 2018 with the opening of the section to Foc station.

References

External links
Trenscat.com

Barcelona Metro line 9 stations
Barcelona Metro line 10 stations
Railway stations in L'Hospitalet de Llobregat
Railway stations in Spain opened in 2016